Pakkinti Ammayi may refer to:
 Pakka Inti Ammayi, an Indian Telugu-language romantic comedy film
 Pakkinti Ammayi (1981 film), an Indian Telugu-language comedy film, a remake of the above